Mole (or Molé) may refer to:

Animals 
 Mole (animal) or "true mole", mammals in the family Talpidae, found in Eurasia and North America
 Golden moles, southern African mammals in the family Chrysochloridae, similar to but unrelated to Talpidae moles
 Marsupial moles, Australian mammals in the family Notoryctidae, similar to but unrelated to Talpidae moles

Other common meanings 
 Mole, colloquial name for a nevus, a growth on human skin
 Melanocytic nevus, another term for mole
 Mole (architecture), a pier, jetty, breakwater, or junction between places separated by water
 Mole (espionage), a spy who inserts himself into an organisation in order to spy on it.

 Mole (sauce), Mexican sauce made from chili peppers, often including fruits, other spices, or chocolate

Arts and entertainment 
 Adrian Mole, the central character in a series of novels by Sue Townsend
 Mole, a main character in the children's novel The Wind in the Willows by Kenneth Grahame
 Mole (Zdeněk Miler character), a Czech animated character
 Monty Mole, a video game character
 Morocco Mole, Secret Squirrel's sidekick
 The Mole, a character in Happy Tree Friends
 The Mole, a criminal in Dick Tracy comic strips
 El Topo (The Mole), a 1970 film
 De Mol (TV series), a reality television show
 "The Mole," a single by Harry James

Science and technology 
 Mole (unit), the SI unit for the amount of substance
 Tunnel boring machine, sometimes called a mole
 "the mole", nickname of a burrowing probe in the Heat Flow and Physical Properties Package which was sent to Mars

People
 Mole (surname)
 Molé, a French surname

Places

Australia
 Mole River (New South Wales)
 Mole Creek (Tasmania)

England 
 River Mole, Surrey
 River Mole, Devon

France
 La Môle, a commune of the Var Département
 Le Môle, a mountain peak in the French Alps

Ghana
 Mole River, a tributary of the White Volta
 Mole National Park, named after the Mole River

India
 Mole, a village in Andhra Pradesh state
 Mole, Karnataka, a village in Karnataka state

Other uses 
 "Mole", NATO reporting name for the Beriev Be-8, a Soviet amphibious aircraft
 "mole", informal name of Cultivator No. 6, a trench-digging machine of World War II
 Mole-Richardson or Mole, a stage and motion picture lighting manufacturing company
 Moll (slang), sometimes spelled mole in Australian English

See also 
 Mole wrench, trade name of a type of locking pliers from M. K. Mole and Son
 Mol (disambiguation)
 The Mole (disambiguation)
 Moles (disambiguation)
 Moll (disambiguation)

Animal common name disambiguation pages